Marek Pivovar (26 June 1964 – 2 January 2021) was a Czech writer, dramaturge, playwright and radio director.

Biography
Pivovar studied the Czech language, history, and theatre studies at Masaryk University in Brno. From 1994 to 2017, he was the dramaturge of the National Moravian-Silesian Theatre in Ostrava. He also became dramaturge of the Mahen Theatre. In 2017, he left the Moravian-Silesian Theatre due to illness and focused on freelance writing.

Marek Pivovar died in Ostrava on 2 January 2021, at the age of 56 after a long illness from COVID-19 complications during the COVID-19 pandemic in the Czech Republic.

References

1964 births
2021 deaths
Czech writers
Czech male dramatists and playwrights
21st-century Czech dramatists and playwrights
Czech directors
Dramaturges
Masaryk University alumni
People from Brno
Deaths from the COVID-19 pandemic in the Czech Republic